Gentianella aurea is a species of flowering plant belonging to the family Gentianaceae.

Its native range is Greenland, Northern and Northeastern Europe, Mongolia.

Synonym:
 Gentiana aurea

References

aurea